In the U.S. state of North Carolina U.S. Route 221 (US 221) is a north–south highway that travels through Western North Carolina.  From Chesnee, South Carolina to Independence, Virginia, it connects the cities of Rutherfordton, Marion, Boone and Jefferson between the two out-of-state destinations.  Its most memorable section, known as the Little Parkway Scenic Byway between Linville and Blowing Rock, offers area visitors a curvier alternative to the Blue Ridge Parkway and access to Grandfather Mountain.

Route description
US 221 enters from South Carolina as a rural superstreet highway, with mostly farms, wooded areas, or homes dotting the road.  After  it connects with US 74, where US 74 Business begins its overlap towards Rutherfordton as a two lane highway (signs of US 74 Business are scarce throughout).  At Rutherfordton, the first major intersection is Charlotte Street, where US 74 Business and US 221A go east.  After Rutherfordton, the road reverts to a rural highway, and continues on to Marion.

Before entering Marion city limits, I-40 intersects with US 221.  US 221 then joins with NC 226, going west around the city on the Marion Bypass.  After the expressway passes the shopping centers along US 70, it continues as a four-lane highway with a turning median all the way to Woodlawn.  Along the way, several business can be seen including shrubbery farms, stone/rock cutters, and a chemical plant.  NC 226 splits at Woodlawn, for travelers that want to go to Spruce Pine while US 221 continues as a divided highway to Pitts Station Road at North Cove.

The climb to Linville Falls is somewhat curvy. It is a route heavily traveled by trucks, and a runaway truck ramp is located along this section.  Also located in this section is Linville Caverns, a small tourist destination.  At Linville Falls, nearby sites include Linville Gorge Wilderness, Linville Falls, (via NC 183) and the Blue Ridge Parkway.

Between Linville Falls and Linville, the highway goes through large tracts of fraser fir farms, from the mountain tops to the valleys.  At Linville, motorists are recommended to follow NC 105/US 221 Truck to Boone and Blowing Rock, which is faster and flatter. Those that continue on what is known as the Little Parkway Scenic Byway come upon an  segment of numerous curves and elevation changes. The entrance to Grandfather Mountain is located near Linville; also nearby is the Linn Cove Viaduct, via the Blue Ridge Parkway.  Those that continue along the scenic route can take a short break at the state rest area.  Near Blowing Rock, visitors may also visit the Julian Price Memorial Park and Moses H. Cone Memorial Park, via Blue Ridge Parkway.

Blowing Rock and Boone are popular year-round tourist destinations; as such the highway between the two towns offers an array of activities include skiing, shopping, amusement rides, and golf.  In Boone, US 221 turns early along NC 105 to King Street, avoiding Appalachian State University and the downtown area; once on King Street (with US 421/NC 194 concurrency), it heads east out of town on a four-lane expressway.

At Deep Gap, US 221 goes north again on what was formerly a slightly curvy two-lane road to Jefferson. This road has been twinned. As the road nears West Jefferson, the road appears to open up, allowing for more views of the surrounding areas.  At West Jefferson and Jefferson, the road serves as a bypass, as well as the last commercialized area along US 221 until Galax, Virginia.

The next  of US 221 is very curvy, similar to the stretch between Linville and Blowing Rock (minus the continuous elevation changes). Between the southern terminus of NC 93 and US 21 in Twin Oaks, US 221 is concurrent with North Carolina Bicycle Route 4. US 221 and US 21 form a concurrency north from Twin Oaks to the Virginia state line.

Dedicated and memorial names

US 221 in North Carolina features a few dedicated or memorialized stretches of highway.

 Dr. Mary Martin Sloop Highway – official North Carolina name of US 221 between Crossnore and Linville.  It is named in honor of Dr. Mary Martin Sloop, the founder of the Crossnore School in 1913.
 Robert C. Hunter Expressway – official North Carolina name of the Marion Bypass in McDowell County.  It is named in honor of Robert C. Hunter, who was a judge in the North Carolina Court of Appeals (approved on November 3, 1989).
 Robert G. Barr Expressway – official North Carolina name of US 221 between Baldwin and Jefferson, named after a politician from West Jefferson (approved on August 14, 1981).
 Trooper Pete Peterson Bridge – official North Carolina name of bridge that carries US 221 over US 74.  It is named in honor of State Trooper Robert L. (Pete) Peterson (approved on January 5, 2001).

History

US 221 was established in 1930, from US 19E/NC 69, in Ingalls to US 21/NC 26, in Twin Oaks; it was in complete concurrency with NC 691.  In 1931, US 221 was extended north, in concurrency with US 21, into Virginia.  In 1932, US 221 was removed from Ingalls/Three Mile area, which remained NC 691, and was placed on new routing south through Woodlawn, Marion, Rutherfordton, Spindale, Forest City and Cliffside, before entering South Carolina.  In late 1934, the following concurrences were removed from US 221: NC 19, NC 28 and NC 207.  In 1941, US 221 was rerouted south of Rutherfordton on a more direct route to Chesnee; its former alignment through Spindale–Cliffside became US 221A.  Around 1953, US 221 was rerouted between Boone and Baldwin, by linking with US 421 to Deep Gap then north on new construction; the old alignment through Todd became an extension of NC 194.

In 1972, US 221 was rerouted with concurrency with NC 105 to King Street in Boone, ending the US 221/US 321/US 421 intersection at Kings Street and Blowing Rock Road.  In 1981, US 221 was placed on new construction between Baldwin and Jefferson, which was two-lane that can be expanded later into a divided four-lane; the old alignment, that went through downtown West Jefferson and Jefferson, became US 221 Business.

In 1991, US 221 was placed on new bypass west of Marion; the old alignment became US 221 Business.  The same year, US 221/NC 181 was placed on a new bypass west of Linville; the former alignment became a secondary road.  In 1997, US 221/US 421 was placed on new construction between NC 194 to the South Fork New River, in Boone.  In 2005, US 221/US 421 was placed on new four-lane expressway between the South Fork New River and Deep Gap; its old alignment, which partially paralleled the Blue Ridge Parkway, was downgraded to secondary roads.

North Carolina Highway 19

North Carolina Highway 19 (NC 19) was an original state highway that traversed from the South Carolina state line, near Tryon, through Columbus, Rutherfordton, Marion and Spruce Pine, to Bakersville.  In 1929, NC 19 was extended to the Tennessee state line, via Ramseytown, replacing part of NC 692. In 1934, NC 19 was decommissioned:  South Carolina state line–Tryon to US 176, Tryon–Rutherfordton to NC 181, Rutherford–Woodlawn to US 221, Woodlawn–Ramseytown to NC 26 and Ramseytown–Tennessee state line to US 19W/US 23.

North Carolina Highway 741

North Carolina Highway 741 (NC 741) existed twice in the state.  Its first appeared by 1930 as a new primary routing between NC 151, north of Midland, through Mount Pleasant, to US 601/NC 80, in Gold Hill.  In 1933, the highway south of Mount Pleasant was downgraded to secondary roads, while north was partially replaced by NC 62 and secondary roads.

The second NC 741 was established in 1935 as a new primary routing between the South Carolina state line, through Harris, to US 74/US 221/NC 181, in Rutherfordton.  In 1941, NC 741 was decommissioned and replaced mostly by US 221, with Jack McKinney Road, between the state line to Harris, as secondary road.

Future
In the Rutherfordton area, NCDOT is constructing an approximately  four-lane freeway bypass to the east of downtown between US 74 to the south and Roper Loop Road in the north. The project is part of a larger plan by NCDOT to convert US 221 between the South Carolina state line and I-40 near Marion to a four-lane divided highway. The Final Environmental Impact Statement (EIS) was approved on May 26, 2011. NCDOT selected Alternate 3 for the alignment of the highway, designated as "Project R-2233B". Construction on the bypass began on February 28, 2022.

Junction list

See also

 Special routes of U.S. Route 221

References

External links

 NCRoads.com: N.C. 19
 NCRoads.com: N.C. 741
 NCRoads.com: U.S. 221

21-2
 North Carolina
Transportation in Rutherford County, North Carolina
Transportation in McDowell County, North Carolina
Transportation in Burke County, North Carolina
Transportation in Avery County, North Carolina
Transportation in Caldwell County, North Carolina
Transportation in Watauga County, North Carolina
Transportation in Ashe County, North Carolina
Transportation in Alleghany County, North Carolina